A mass movement denotes a political party or movement which is supported by large segments of a population. Political movements that typically advocate the creation of a mass movement include the ideologies of communism, fascism, and liberalism. Both communists and fascists typically support the creation of mass movements as a means to overthrow a government and create their own government, the mass movement then being used afterwards to protect the government from being overthrown itself; whereas liberals seek mass participation in the system of representative democracy.

The social scientific study of mass movements focuses on such elements as charisma, leadership, active minorities, cults and sects, followers, mass man and mass society, alienation, brainwashing and indoctrination,  authoritarianism and totalitarianism. The field emerged from crowd or mass psychology (Le Bon, Tarde a.o.), which had gradually widened its scope from mobs to social movements and opinion currents, and then to mass and media society. 
One influential early text was the double essay on the herd instinct (1908) by British surgeon Wilfred Trotter. It also influenced the key concepts of the superego and identification in Massenpsychologie (1921) by Sigmund Freud, misleadingly translated as Group psychology. They are linked to ideas on sexual repression leading to rigid personalities, in the original Mass psychology of fascism (1933) by Freudo-Marxist Wilhelm Reich (not to be confused with its totally revised 1946 American version). This then rejoined ideas formulated by the Frankfurt School and Theodor Adorno, ultimately leading to a major American study of the authoritarian personality (1950), as a basis for xenophobia and anti-Semitism.
Another early theme was the relationship between masses and elites, both outside and within such movements (Gaetano Mosca, Vilfredo Pareto, Robert Michels, Moisey Ostrogorski).

See also

Bibliography

Hoffer, Eric, The True Believer: Thoughts on the Nature of Mass Movements, New York, NY: Harper Perennial Modern Classics, 2002.
Marx, Gary, T. & McAdam, Douglas, Collective behavior and social movements, Englewood Cliffs, NJ: Prentice Hall, 1994.
Van Ginneken, Jaap, Mass movements – In Darwinist, Freudian and Marxist perspective, Apeldoorn (Neth.): Spinhuis. 2007.
Wilson, John, Introduction to social movements, New York: Basic, 1973.

Political movements